Enrique Burgos may refer to:

Enrique Burgos (baseball, born 1965), Panamanian baseball player
Enrique Burgos (baseball, born 1990), Panamanian baseball player
Enrique Burgos García (born 1946), Mexican politician
Kike Burgos (born 1971), born Enrique Burgos Carrasco, Spanish footballer